

Max Sperling (4 September 1905 – 6 June 1984) was a German officer in the Wehrmacht during World War II who briefly commanded the 9th Panzer Division. He was a recipient of the Knight's Cross of the Iron Cross of Nazi Germany.

Awards and decorations

 Knight's Cross of the Iron Cross on 6 April 1944 as Major and commander of Panzergrenadier-Regiment 11

References

Citations

Bibliography

 

1905 births
1984 deaths
People from Chełmno
People from West Prussia
German Army personnel
Recipients of the Gold German Cross
Recipients of the Knight's Cross of the Iron Cross
Reichswehr personnel